'N Crugu Bradului is a concept album by Negură Bunget, released by the Code666 label in 2002 in a digibook format, constructed manually by the members themselves and limited to 3,000 copies worldwide (the second pressing was in a regular jewel case CD). Each song represents a season. The album title translates to "Through the Depths of the Fir Tree Heights".

Track listing
 All songs written by Negură Bunget.
 "I (Primăvară)" – 12:11
 "II (Vară)" – 13:21
 "III (Toamnă)" – 15:12
 "IIII (Iarnă)" – 12:56

Note: The words in brackets are the four seasons in Romanian, but they do not appear on any release. The official names are "I", "II", "III" and "IIII".

The multimedia portion of the disc also included the video for the track "Văzduh".

Personnel
 Hupogrammos Disciple – guitars, vocals, keyboards, bass guitar, tulnic, nai
 Sol Faur – guitars
 Negru – drums, percussion, xylophone

Additional personnel
 Ursu – bass guitar

Production
 Produced, engineered and mixed by Cristi Solomon and Negură Bunget
 Dan Florin Spataru – artwork, art direction, design, cover design, photography

2002 albums
Negură Bunget albums
Romanian-language albums
Concept albums